Persona 3: Dancing in Moonlight is a rhythm game developed and published by Atlus for the PlayStation 4 and PlayStation Vita. Forming part of the Persona series—itself part of the larger Megami Tensei franchise—the game features the central cast of the 2006 role-playing video game Persona 3. Gameplay focuses on characters from Persona 3 taking part in rhythm-based gameplay set to original and remixed music from Persona 3. It was released in Japan in May 2018, and worldwide in December 2018. The game received mixed reviews from critics.

Development began in 2015 following the release and positive reception of Persona 4: Dancing All Night. Multiple staff returned from Dancing All Night, including character designer Shigenori Soejima and composer Ryota Kozuka. Dancing in Moonlight was the first of two rhythm games planned as follow-ups to Dancing All Night, the other being the simultaneously-developed Persona 5: Dancing in Starlight.

Premise and gameplay

Persona 3: Dancing in Moonlight is a rhythm game based on the role-playing video game Persona 3. Featuring the central cast of Persona 3, gameplay follows a similar pattern to Persona 4: Dancing All Night; a chosen character performs a song in a story location from Persona 3, with the player using a six-button system to hit notes in time to the present musical track. During a section of the song dubbed "Fever", a chosen partner joins in for the routine, with unique choreography for each partner reflecting the characters' relationship within Persona 3. Interactions between characters between songs take place in the Velvet Room, a recurring location in the Persona series.

Synopsis

Setting and characters

The playable cast of Dancing in Moonlight consists of major party members in Persona 3: Makoto Yuki, Yukari Takeba, Junpei Iori, Akihiko Sanada, Mitsuru Kirijo, Fuuka Yamagishi, Ken Amada, and Aigis. The story takes place in the Velvet Room, a mysterious place between the world of dreams and reality, which Elizabeth has temporarily renovated into Club Velvet. Various locations from Persona 3 appear as stages for the dance gameplay.

Plot
Dancing in Moonlight takes place after the events of Persona 4: Dancing All Night. Upon hearing about the success of Margaret's dancers, her sister Elizabeth becomes jealous. Including Caroline and Justine, who appear in Persona 5: Dancing in Starlight, the sisters challenge each other to a dance-off. Elizabeth acts as a producer for her dancers, which includes major playable characters from Persona 3. The event takes place within a dream in the Velvet Room, with everyone's memories of it being erased afterwards. The characters are also provided exact replicas of their own bedrooms in the real world, to rest in between dances. After completion of the ball, Elizabeth declares that it does not matter who won because they all had fun, and joins the dancers herself.

Development and release
Following the positive response to Dancing All Night following its 2015 release, P-Studio—an Atlus department responsible for managing the Persona series—were encouraged to make a rhythm game based on the setting and characters of Persona 3. Dancing in Moonlight was developed simultaneously with Persona 5: Dancing in Starlight due to Persona 5 being in development at the time. Using their experience from developing Dancing All Night, the team focused on improving the experience for their new projects. The development proved challenging as the team were creating two game's worth of content at the same time. Kazuhisa Wada, who produced and directed Dancing All Night, returned as producer. Originally intending to produce and direct again, the game was instead directed by Nobuyoshi Miwa. Shigenori Soejima returned as character designer. The game was developed for both PlayStation 4 (PS4) and PlayStation Vita, with the main difference being that the PS4 version ran at a higher frame rate. The team initially intended to have both Dancing titles as a single game, but decided against this due to the two projects' strong and contrasting identities.

While the characters remained faithful to their designs, they were given highly acrobatic dance movements. To increase the variety of dance moves between characters, each character had a specific dancer and unique choreography. In Dancing All Night each character was assigned a dance genre and given limited moves due to their lack of experience in the game's story, but Dancing in Moonlight allowed for customised choreography based on character personalities. Compared to Dancing All Night, the visual quality of character models was raised. They also moved more smoothly due to a large number of "double joint" parts in the internal skeleton not present in the models for Dancing All Night. Dancing in Moonlight was the first time the cast of Persona 3 had been rendered with realistic proportions. It was also the first time the models accurately copied Soejima's artwork. Creating the models for Persona 3 cast members was a challenge due to the variety of ways they had been portrayed in anime and manga since the original game's release. Aigis, who required robotic movements without sacrificing flexibility or fluidity, was the most difficult character model to create. The movement of clothing—which was based solely on physics calculations in Dancing All Night—used a combination of physics and clothing material combined with character choreography.

While a story mode and new location were used in Dancing All Night, the team decided to replace it with a system based on character interactions within the original settings and scenario, though a minor story mode was included anyway. This decision was made following talks between Wada and Miwa. Creating the dormitory setting for Dancing in Moonlight was easy due to its simplistic design. Due to the game's tone compared to the main Persona series, the team felt had greater freedom to put lighter and colorful elements into Dancing in Moonlight.

Dancing in Moonlight features 25 songs from Persona 3. Original music was composed by Ryota Kozuka, who had previously worked on Dancing All Night; one of his compositions was the opening theme "Our Moment". Remixes of tracks from Persona 3 were supervised by Kozuka and original composer Shoji Meguro, along with Atsushi Kitajoh and Toshiki Konishi. Additional remixes were done by guest musicians Yuu Miyake, Hideki Naganuma, Yuyoyuppe, Tetsuya Kobayashi, ATOLS, Novoiski, Lotus Juice, Sasakure.UK, T.Komine and Daisuke Asakura. The list of tracks that would be included was modified throughout the development process. Due to the long-established sound of Persona 3 since the original game's release, the theme song of Dancing in Moonlight was designed to reflect that sound. A particular Persona 3 track released as downloadable content (DLC), "Jika Net Tanaka", was initially planned as a very difficult track for Dancing All Night before being cut.

The game was first announced in August 2017 alongside Dancing in Starlight and the spin-off title Persona Q2. The team plans to release downloadable content for the game. The game was released in Japan on May 24, 2018. Two special editions were created for PS4 and Vita. The PS4 version came with physical copies of Dancing in Moonlight and Dancing in Starlight, a download code for the digital-exclusive PS4 port of Dancing All Night, and a full soundtrack. The Vita version included Dancing in Moonlight and Dancing in Starlight, the full soundtrack, and costume DLC based on protagonists from the wider Megami Tensei series. The game also supports PlayStation VR.

Persona 3: Dancing in Moonlight was chosen as the title for its release outside of Japan on December 4, 2018, with a full English dub, dual audio options, and subtitles in English, French, Italian, German, and Spanish.

Reception

Dancing in Moonlight received mixed reviews from critics. Review aggregator website Metacritic calculated a score of 73/100 based on 26 reviews.

The game's graphics were well-received. The customizable costumes were also praised, with Hardcore Gamers Jacob Bukacek commenting that "fans who enjoy this kind of thing should have a lot of fun seeing their favorite [characters] do their dance routines in these outlandish outfits."

Criticism was directed towards Dancing in Moonlight for its rhythm gameplay. The layout of notes appearing from the middle of the screen was perceived as awkward, cluttered, and hard to follow. In his review on GameInformer, Suriel Vazquez recounted that he sometimes failed to notice notes due to how busy the screen is. The modifier system, through which players can make the gameplay easier or harder, was liked as an addition for its easily customizable nature.

The social event mechanics were divisive among critics. Some said that it was not as in-depth and interesting as the story mode featured in Dancing All Night, such as Britanny Vincent of Shacknews, who felt there was "no substance to these brief interactions." Others enjoyed the less serious tone and emphasis on character interactions. Robert Ramsey from Push Square contested that the social events "fit the structure of the game a lot better than a long-winded story mode."

A common complaint about Dancing in Moonlight is its lack of content. Nathan Lee of RPG Fan described 25 songs as "a paltry amount, especially considering that same song might have both an original and a remixed version." Other criticism was directed at certain characters missing, such as party member Koromaru and the female protagonist in Portable.

Notes

References

External links
 
 Official Japanese website

2018 video games
Atlus games
Music video games
PlayStation Vita games
PlayStation 4 games
Persona (series)
Video games set in Japan
Video games developed in Japan
PlayStation VR games
Video games set in 2009